Acrocercops synclinias is a moth of the family Gracillariidae. It is known from Indonesia (Java) and Malaysia (West Malaysia).

The larvae feed on Saraca declinata and Saraca thaipingensis. They probably mine the leaves of their host plant.

References

synclinias
Moths of Asia
Moths described in 1931